Claiborne Parish is a parish located in the northwestern section of the U.S. state of Louisiana. The parish was formed in 1828, and was named for the first Louisiana governor, William C. C. Claiborne.  As of the 2020 census, the population was 14,170. The parish seat is Homer.

History
John Murrell moved his family from Arkansas to the Flat Lick Bayou area about 6 miles west of present-day Homer in 1818, and they became the first known non-natives to permanently settle in Claiborne Parish.  As more settlers moved into the area, the Murrell house served as a church, school and post office.  When the state legislature created Claiborne Parish out of Natchitoches Parish in 1828, all governmental business, including court, began being held in the Murrell house.  This continued until the new parish's police jury selected Russellville (now a ghost town located northeast of Athens) as the parish seat.  As the population began swelling in what was then the western part of the parish, the seat was moved to Overton (another modern ghost town found near Minden) in 1836, because of its position at the head of the navigable portion of Dorcheat Bayou. Due to flooding and health concerns, the parish seat was moved to Athens in 1846, but an 1848 fire destroyed the courthouse and all the records in it.  Soon thereafter the Claiborne Police Jury chose the present site for the parish seat, which came to be named, Homer.

Much of the area history is preserved in the Herbert S. Ford Memorial Museum, located across from the parish courthouse in Homer.

Government and infrastructure
Louisiana Department of Public Safety and Corrections operates the David Wade Correctional Center in an unincorporated section of Claiborne Parish near Homer and Haynesville.

Geography

Major highways
  Future Interstate 69
  U.S. Highway 79
  Louisiana Highway 2
  Louisiana Highway 9

Adjacent parishes
 Columbia County, Arkansas  (northwest)
 Union County, Arkansas  (northeast)
 Union Parish  (east)
 Lincoln Parish  (southeast)
 Bienville Parish  (south)
 Webster Parish  (west)

National protected area
 Kisatchie National Forest (part)

Communities

Towns
 Haynesville
 Homer (parish seat and largest municipality)

Villages
 Athens
 Lisbon
 Junction City

Unincorporated communities
 Arizona
 Lake Claiborne
 Marsalis
 Russellville
 Summerfield

Demographics

As of the 2020 United States census, there were 14,170 people, 5,917 households, and 3,718 families residing in the parish.

Politics
With a narrow majority of African Americans in the population, Claiborne Parish in the years after the civil rights movement was primarily Democratic in political complexion. In 1988, Vice President George Herbert Walker Bush prevailed in Claiborne Parish with 3,756 votes (53.6 percent). Governor Michael S. Dukakis of Massachusetts trailed with 3,158 votes (45.1 percent). In 1996, U.S. President Bill Clinton of neighboring Arkansas, obtained 3,609 votes (53.6 percent) in Claiborne Parish. Republican Bob Dole of Kansas polled  2,500 votes (37.1 percent).

However, by 2008, U.S. Senator John McCain of Arizona easily carried the parish in his losing race to Barack H. Obama. McCain polled 3,750 votes (54.8 percent) to Obama's  3,025 votes (44.2 percent). In 2012, Mitt Romney carried the parish, with 3,649 votes (54.2 percent), nearly identical to the McCain tally four years earlier. President Obama received  3,014 votes (44.8 percent), or .6 of 1 percent greater than his earlier tabulation.

Education
Claiborne Parish School Board serves the parish.

Claiborne Academy is a private institution in an unincorporated area in the parish, near Haynesville.

Notable people

Prominent Claiborne Parish residents include or have included:
 Alfred Goodwill, landowner in Claiborne Parish
 T. H. Harris, state education superintendent from 1908 to 1940.
 Andrew R. Johnson was a state senator from Claiborne and Bienville parishes from 1916 to 1924.
 John Sidney Killen, state representative for Claiborne Parish in 1871
 Joe LeSage, state senator for Caddo Parish from 1968 to 1972; Shreveport attorney born in Homer
 George H. Mahon, Former U.S. Representative
 James T. McCalman, state senator from Claiborne and Bienville parishes from 1960 to 1964.
 Danny Roy Moore, state senator from 1964 to 1968.
 Dave L. Pearce, Louisiana Commissioner of Agriculture and Forestry from 1952-1956 and 1960-1976.
 Larry Sale, sheriff of Claiborne Parish from 1936 to 1944; bodyguard at the assassination of Huey Pierce Long Jr.
 Richard Stalder, former secretary of the Louisiana Department of Public Safety and Corrections.
 David Wade, Lieutenant General of the United States Air Force.
 Loy F. Weaver, state representative from 1976 to 1984.
 Mule Watson, pitcher in Major League Baseball from 1918–24.
 Pinkie C. Wilkerson state representative from 1992 to 2000. 

Patrick Floyd Garrett, Sheriff of Lincoln County New Mexico, and killer of Billy the Kid, lived here as a child, the family having moved from Alabama to Louisiana in late 1850s

Gallery

See also
 National Register of Historic Places listings in Claiborne Parish, Louisiana

References

External links
 Claiborne Parish official website
 Water Resources of Claiborne Parish, Louisiana United States Geological Survey

 
Louisiana parishes
1828 establishments in Louisiana
Populated places established in 1828
Majority-minority parishes in Louisiana